Robert Henderson (born November 9, 1983) is a former American football defensive end. He was drafted by the New York Giants in the sixth round of the 2008 NFL Draft. He played college football at Southern Mississippi.

Henderson has also been a member of the Jacksonville Jaguars, Detroit Lions and Seattle Seahawks.

Early years
He was a three-year letterwinner at Ponchatoula High School. He recorded 77 solo tackles, 43 assists, three sacks, four hurries, six pass breakups, one forced fumble, two fumble recoveries and one interception. As a running back, he finished with 41 carries, 342 yards and scored four touchdowns with a long carry of 77 yards.  He was a First-team All-State and First-team All-District and also lettered in basketball.

College career
He played in 46 games with 33 starts at the "Bandit" defensive end position. His career totals include 173 tackles (115 solo), 13.5 and 29.5 stops for losses and also forced 7 fumbles and recovered another and deflected 9 passes and blocked a kick. He played in the 2007 GMAC Bowl, when he forced a fumble in the win over Ohio. In 2006, he was named Second-team All-Conference USA.

Professional career

Pre-draft

New York Giants
Henderson was a 6th round (199th pick overall) draft choice by the New York Giants in the 2008 NFL Draft. He injured his ankle in his NFL preseason debut and spent his entire rookie season on injured reserve. He was waived on September 5, 2009.

Jacksonville Jaguars
The Jacksonville Jaguars signed Henderson to their practice squad on September 15, 2009. He was released on September 29.

Detroit Lions
Henderson was signed to the Detroit Lions practice squad on October 14, 2009. After his practice squad contract expired, Henderson was re-signed to a future reserve contract on January 5, 2010.

Seattle Seahawks
On April 5, 2010, Henderson was traded to the Seattle Seahawks with a 2010 fifth-round draft pick for offensive lineman Rob Sims and a 2010 seventh-round draft pick.

References

External links
Detroit Lions bio
New York Giants bio
Southern Miss Golden Eagles bio

1983 births
Living people
American football defensive ends
Detroit Lions players
Edmonton Elks players
Jacksonville Jaguars players
New York Giants players
Omaha Nighthawks players
People from Ponchatoula, Louisiana
Players of American football from Louisiana
Seattle Seahawks players
Southern Miss Golden Eagles football players
New Orleans VooDoo players